Javel is a station on RER C in the 15th arrondissement of Paris, by the Pont Mirabeau.

The station is built on a bridge over the railway situated in a cutting. It was built for the 1900 Exposition Universelle. The building is a metal structure filled in with plain bricks on the lower part and decor on the top part. Stone was used to build retainer walls along the two platforms of the station.

Javel is now a station on the RER C line of the Paris express suburban rail system.

Gallery

Adjacent station 
 Javel–André Citroën on Paris Métro Line 10 is within walking distance.

Tourism 
 Parc André Citroën

See also 
 List of stations of the Paris RER
 List of stations of the Paris Métro
 Javel, Paris

External links 

 

Réseau Express Régional stations
Railway stations in Paris
Railway stations in France opened in 1889
Buildings and structures in the 15th arrondissement of Paris